Matthias Biedermann (born 28 January 1983) is a German male skeleton racer, who took part in the 2005/2006 Skeleton World Cup trying to qualify for the 2006 Winter Olympics. He won the silver medal at the first skeleton World Cup race held in Turin.

World Cup 2005/2006 results 
 28th on November 10, 2005, Calgary CAN
 7th on November 17, 2005, Lake Placid, New York, U.S.

References

External links
 

1983 births
Living people
German male skeleton racers
21st-century German people